The Gruta do Carvão (Grotto of Coal) is an ancient lava tube located on the outskirts of the municipality of Ponta Delgada (in the civil parish of Santa Clara) on the island of São Miguel in the Portuguese archipelago of the Azores.

History

Gaspar Frutuoso, the 16th century chronicler and historian wrote:
"Afar, a short way from the Fortress, going west, is a place called Ponta dos Algares, because there are two grottos with their opening, inside which there is a large underground path where rivers of lava seeming to have run in ancient times, not known nor seen."

Owing to its scientific, educational and touristic relevance, as well as its natural characteristics, the Gruta do Carvão was classified as a Regional natural Monument by Regional Decree 4/2005/A on 11 May 2005.

Geography

 
The Gruta is situated in the parish of Santa Clara, in the northwest part of Ponta Delgada and is integrated into the Monumento Natural Regional da Gruta do Carvão (Regional Natural Monument of Gruta do Carvão), to the northwest of water reservoirs of SMAS, along Rua do Paim.

It is divided into three sections: Rua de Lisboa (or Secadores de Tabaco), Rua do Paim and Rua João do Rego.

Along the cavern walls are speleological structures such as lateral benches, lava bridges, branching galleries, lava balls, stalactites, stalagmites, columns, spongy lavas, glaze and tree moulds. Apart from several cracks, the walls and ceiling are multi-coloured (orange to yellowish) due to the basalt oxidization. There are also conical-shaped stalactites, secondary mineral deposits of silica and earthen deposits covering the walls and ceiling.

See also
Protected areas of the Azores

References

Notes

Sources
 

Ponta Delgada
Lava tubes
Gruta Carvao
Protected areas of Portugal